Paolo Bolpagni (born in Brescia) is an Italian art historian, critic and curator.

Life 
Bolpagni was born in Brescia, in Lombardy in northern Italy. He graduated in letters from the Università Cattolica del Sacro Cuore in Brescia, and then completed a doctorate in history of art at the same university in Milan. Since 2010 he has taught at the Brescia campus of the university. He also teaches at the Università degli Studi eCampus.

He won the Premio Sulmona for history of art in 2013; he is the youngest person to have won the prize.

Work 
In 2011–2012, he created a channel on YouTube where he presented short videos on the history of contemporary art.

Publications 
 L'arte nell'"Avanti della Domenica" 1903-1907, Mazzotta, Milan, 2008.
 Mario Ballocco, Silvana Editoriale, Cinisello Balsamo, 2009.
 Visioni musicali. Rapporti tra musica e arti visive nel Novecento (with Francesco Tedeschi), Vita e Pensiero, Milan, 2009.
 Ritmi visivi. Luigi Veronesi nell'astrattismo europeo, Edizioni Fondazione Ragghianti Studi sull'Arte, Lucca, 2011.
 Arte, socialità, politica. Articoli dell'"Avanti della Domenica" 1903-1907, Fondazione Anna Kuliscioff - EDIFIS, Milan, 2011.
 Fortuny e Wagner. Il wagnerismo nelle arti visive in Italia, Fondazione Musei Civici di Venezia - Skira, Venice-Milan, 2012.
 All'Origine della forma. Mario Ballocco - Alberto Burri - Giuseppe Capogrossi - Ettore Colla, Allemandi, Turin-Milan, 2013.
 Brescia. Breathtaking beauty, La Compagnia della Stampa, Brescia, 2015.
 Sguardi paralleli: Ballocco / Morellet, Edizioni Fondazione Ragghianti Studi sull'Arte, Lucca, 2016.

References 

Italian art historians
Italian art critics
Italian art curators
Writers from Brescia
Living people
Year of birth missing (living people)